Impetuoso was the name of at least three ships of the Italian Navy and may refer to:

 , an  launched in 1913 and sunk in 1916.
 , a  launched in 1943 and scuttled later that year.
 , an  launched in 1958 and decommissioned in 1983.

Italian Navy ship names